The Czech Republic women's national under-17 football team is the national under-17 football team of Czech Republic and is governed by the Fotbalová asociace České republiky (FAČR).

Competitive record

FIFA Women's Under-17 World Cup

UEFA Women's Under-17 Championship

References

External links
Official Team website
Official FAČR website
UEFA profile
Soccerway.com profile

Czech Republic national football team
Women's national under-17 association football teams
European women's national under-17 association football teams